Seth "Fingers" Flynn Barkan (born July 20, 1980) is an American poet and journalist.

Biography
He grew up and still currently resides in Las Vegas, Nevada, which has an evidently strong influence on the content and mood of his poetry. His first volume of poetry, A Cacophony of Near-Fatal Mistakes, was published in 2001 when he was only nineteen years old, and was described in an interview with Barkan as "collection of poems about booze, jazz and his "propensity towards disastrous relationships."

His second volume of poetry, Blue Wizard Is About To Die!: Prose, Poems, and Emoto-Versatronic Expressionist Pieces About Video Games (1980–2003), sold over 5000 copies internationally, making it one of the best-selling poetry books of 2004.

His most recent work, a chapbook entitled Your Madness And You: An Instructional Pamphlet, is written from the perspective of the fictional psychologist Doktor Nicodemus Strangelove, detailing the inevitable deterioration of sanity experienced by anyone who chooses to make Las Vegas their home.

Bibliography
 A Cacophony of Near-Fatal Mistakes (paperback, 2001, Jazzclaw) 
 A Cacophony of Near-Fatal Mistakes (spoken word CD, 2002?, Rusty Immelman Press)
 Blue Wizard Is About To Die!: Prose, Poems, and Emoto-Versatronic Expressionist Pieces About Video Games (1980–2003) (paperback, 2004, Rusty Immelman Press) 
 Your Madness And You: An Instructional Pamphlet (chapbook, 2005?, Rusty Immelman Press)

Notes

External links
 https://web.archive.org/web/20041116201944/http://www.lvcitylife.com/articles/2004/11/04/features/cover02.txt
 Official site for Blue Wizard Is About To Die!
 Author biography
 http://rustyimmelman.livejournal.com/profile
 https://web.archive.org/web/20070930030555/http://www.lasvegassun.com/sunbin/stories/leisure/2004/apr/05/516641028.html

1980 births
American male journalists
Poets from Nevada
Living people
People from the Las Vegas Valley
American male poets
21st-century American poets
21st-century American male writers